Jitka is a Czech female given name. It is nickname of Hebrew name Judith, meaning He will be praised or woman of Judea. The old Czech form is Jutka, derived the German name Jutta. Name day celebrate 5 December. Pronounced "YIT-kah".

Famous bearers 
 Jitka ze Svinibrodu - Czech princess
 Jitka Babická - Czech figure skater
 Jitka Čechová - Czech actress
 Judita Čeřovská - Czech jazz and swing singer
 Jitka Čvančarová - Czech actress
 Jitka Harazimova - Czech professional bodybuilder
 Jitka Janáčková (born 1973, Mladá Boleslav), a Czech-Czechoslovak sprint canoer
 Jitka Kocurová - Czech model
 Jitka Landová - Czech Biathlete
 Jitka Legatová, a Czechoslovak slalom canoer
 Jitka Licenik - Czech-Canadian journalist
 Jitka Molavcová - Czech actress and singer
 Jitka Němcová - Czech director
 Jitka Obzinová - Czech journalist
 Jitka Seitlová - Czech politician
 Jitka Schneiderová - Czech actress
 Jitka Bartosová - Czech linguist
 Jitka Smutná - Czech actress
 Jitka Snížková (1924 - 1989), a Czech composer, music educator and musicologist
 Jitka Traplová, a Czechoslovak slalom canoer
 Jitka Válová - Czech painter
 Jitka Válková, a Czech beauty pageant contestant from Třebíč
 Jitka Zelenková - Czech pop singer
 Jitka Zelenohorská - Czech actress

See also 
 3395 Jitka (1985 UN), a main-belt asteroid discovered on 1985 by A. Mrkos

Czech feminine given names